The City of Leeds is a city and metropolitan borough in West Yorkshire, England. The metropolitan borough includes the administrative centre of Leeds and the towns of Farsley, Garforth, Guiseley, Horsforth, Morley, Otley, Pudsey, Rothwell, Wetherby and Yeadon. It is Governed by Leeds City Council & the Borough's 32 Parish Councils.

The current city boundaries were set on 1 April 1974 by the provisions of the Local Government Act 1972, as part a reform of local government in England. The city is a merger of eleven former local government districts; the unitary City and County Borough of Leeds combined with the municipal boroughs of Morley and Pudsey, the urban districts of Aireborough, Garforth, Horsforth, Otley and Rothwell, and parts of the rural districts of Tadcaster, Wharfedale and Wetherby from the West Riding of Yorkshire.

For its first 12 years the city had a two-tier system of local government; Leeds City Council shared power with West Yorkshire County Council. Since the Local Government Act 1985 Leeds City Council has effectively been a unitary authority, serving as the sole (aside from the 32 Parish Councils) executive, deliberative and legislative body responsible for local policy, setting council tax, and allocating budget in the city, and is a member of the Leeds City Region Partnership.

Although the City of Leeds is divided into 32 civil parishes, most of Leeds' population currently live in unparished areas, which can be created under provisions contained within  The 2011 Localism Act.

History

Background

The Borough of Leeds was created in 1207, when Maurice Paynel, lord of the manor, granted a charter covering a small area adjacent to a crossing of the River Aire, between the old settlement centred on Leeds Parish Church to the east and the manor house and mills to the west. In 1626 a charter was granted by Charles I, incorporating the entire parish as the Borough of Leeds; it was reformed by the Municipal Corporations Act 1835. The parish and borough included the chapelries of Chapel Allerton, Armley, Beeston, Bramley, Farnley, Headingley cum Burley, Holbeck, Hunslet, Leeds, Potternewton and Wortley. The borough was located in the West Riding of Yorkshire and gained city status in 1893. When a county council was formed for the riding in 1889, Leeds was excluded from its area of responsibility and formed a county borough.

Formation
A review of local government arrangements completed in 1969 proposed the creation of a new large district centred on Leeds, occupying  and including 840,000 people. The proposed area was significantly reduced in a 1971 white paper; and within a year every local authority to be incorporated into it protested or demonstrated. The final proposal reduced the area further and following the enactment of the Local Government Act 1972, the county borough was abolished on 1 April 1974 and its former area was combined with that of the municipal boroughs of Morley and Pudsey; the urban districts of Aireborough, Horsforth, Otley, Garforth and Rothwell; and parts of the rural districts of Tadcaster, Wetherby and Wharfedale. The new district gained both borough and city status, as had been held by the county borough; and forms part of the county of West Yorkshire.

Geography

The district and its settlements are situated in the eastern foothills of the Pennines astride the River Aire whose valley, the Aire Gap, provides a road and rail corridor that facilitates communications with cities to the west of the Pennines. The highest point, at 1,115 feet (340 m), is at its north western extremity on the eastern slopes of Rombalds Moor, better known as Ilkley Moor, on the boundary with the City of Bradford. The lowest points are at around 33 feet (10 m), in the east: where River Wharfe crosses the boundary with North Yorkshire south of Thorp Arch Trading Estate and where the River Aire (at this point forming the City of Wakefield boundary) meets the North Yorkshire boundary near Fairburn Ings. To the north and east Leeds is bordered by the North Yorkshire districts of Harrogate to the north and Selby district to the east. The remaining borders are with other districts of West Yorkshire: Wakefield to the south, Kirklees to the south-west, and Bradford to the west.

Governance

Leeds City Council is the local authority of the district. The council is composed of 99 councillors, three for each of the city's 33 wards. Elections are held three years out of four, on the first Thursday of May. One third of the councillors are elected, for a four-year term, in each election. 2004 saw all seats up for election due to boundary changes. It is currently run by a Labour administration. Before the 2011 election, the council had been under no overall control since 2004. The Chief Executive of Leeds City Council is Tom Riordan, and the Leader of the Council is Councillor James Lewis of the Labour Party. As a metropolitan county, West Yorkshire does not have a county council, so Leeds City Council is the primary provider of local government services. The district forms part of the Yorkshire and the Humber region of England.

Most of the district is an unparished area, comprising Leeds itself (the area of the former county borough), Pudsey, Garforth, Rothwell and the area of the former urban district of Aireborough. In the unparished area there is no lower tier of government. Outside the unparished area there are 31 civil parishes, represented by parish councils. These form the lowest tier of local government and absorb some limited functions from Leeds City Council in their areas. The councils of the civil parishes of Horsforth, Morley, Otley and Wetherby are town councils. The 34 other civil parishes are:

The district is represented by eight MPs, for the constituencies of Elmet and Rothwell (Alec Shelbrooke, Conservative); Leeds Central (Hilary Benn, Labour); Leeds East (Richard Burgon, Labour); Leeds North East (Fabian Hamilton, Labour); Leeds North West (Alex Sobel, Labour); Leeds West (Rachel Reeves, Labour); Morley and Outwood (constituency shared with City of Wakefield) (Andrea Jenkyns, Conservative); and Pudsey (Stuart Andrew, Conservative).

Demography

At the 2001 UK census, the district had a total population of 715,402. Of the 301,614 households in Leeds, 33.3% were married couples living together, 31.6% were one-person households, 9.0% were co-habiting couples and 9.8% were lone parents, following a similar trend to the rest of England. Of those aged 16–74, 30.9% had no academic qualifications, higher than the 28.9% in all of England. Of the residents, 6.6% were born outside the United Kingdom, lower than the England average of 9.2%.

The majority of people in Leeds identify themselves as Christian. The proportion of Muslims is around National average. Leeds has the third-largest Jewish community in the United Kingdom, after those of London and Manchester. The areas of Alwoodley and Moortown contain sizeable Jewish populations. 16.8% of Leeds residents in the 2001 census declared themselves as having "no religion", which is broadly in line with the figure for the whole of the UK (also 8.1% "religion not stated").

The crime rate in Leeds is well above the national average, like many other cities in England. In July 2006, the think tank Reform calculated rates of crime for different offences and has related this to populations of major urban areas (defined as towns over 100,000 population). Leeds was 11th in this rating (excluding London boroughs, 23rd including London boroughs).

Economy

Leeds has a diverse economy with the service sector now dominating over the traditional manufacturing industries. It is the location of one of the largest financial centres in England outside London. New tertiary industries such as retail, call centres, offices and media have contributed to a high rate of economic growth. This is a chart of trend of regional gross value added of Leeds at current basic prices with figures in millions of pounds.

Education

Education Leeds, a non-profit company owned by Leeds City Council, provided educational services between 2001 and 2011. In April 2011 Leeds City Council disbanded Education Leeds and has consolidated educational services into the Children's Services Department of the council itself.

Transport

Leeds city centre is connected to the National Rail network at Leeds railway station. Public transport in West Yorkshire is coordinated by West Yorkshire Metro, under the control of a joint-board of local authorities in the county, including Leeds City Council.

Public services
There are 24 cemeteries in Leeds operated by the City Council. The oldest ones, in Beckett Street and Hunslet, were both opened in 1845; the newest ones, in Kippax and Whinmoor, opened in 2013.

Twin cities

The City has several twinning or partnership arrangements:

Leeds is also currently in the process of twinning with Kharkiv, in Ukraine
 Kharkiv, Ukraine

Notes and references

Notes
 includes hunting and forestry
 includes energy and construction
 includes financial intermediation services indirectly measured
 Components may not sum to totals due to rounding
References

Bibliography

External links

Leeds City Council Leeds City Council.
'Leeds Chamber of Commerce & Industry' Leeds Chamber of Commerce & Industry.
'Leeds Initiative' Leeds Initiative city partnership.
Leodis Leeds Library & Information Service photograph archive.

City of
Cities in Yorkshire and the Humber
Metropolitan boroughs
Local government districts in West Yorkshire